Robert Michael Medew is an Australian singer-songwriter who fronted The Screaming Tribesmen, which formed in Brisbane in 1981. Medew has written or co-written a number of independent hits, "Igloo", "Date with a Vampyre" and "I Got a Feeling", which peaked at number seven on the Billboard Hot Modern Rock Tracks college charts.

Biography

1979-1998: The 31st & The Screaming Tribesmen

Mick Medew as lead vocalist and guitarist formed a straight-ahead hard rock band, The 31st, in Brisbane in 1979, with Ron Peno (ex-The Hellcats) on vocals, Tony Robertson (ex-Credits, ex -Wasted Daze) on bass guitar and Chris Welsh on drums. They were joined by Brad Shepherd (ex-Fun Things) on guitar in mid-1980. Medew and Peno co-wrote "Igloo" and "Stand Alone".

In early 1981, Peno and Welsh left (eventually forming Died Pretty), Robertson and Shepherd joined The Hitmen in Sydney and Medew formed Screaming Tribesmen in Brisbane. Medew recruited John Hartley (ex-Fun Things) on bass guitar and backing vocals and Brad's younger brother Murray Shepherd (ex-Fun Things) on drums. Screaming Tribesmen had a variable line-up and relocated to Sydney. They had a number seven hit single on the Alternative Songs (formerly Billboard Hot Modern Rock Tracks) with the Medew-penned, "I Got a Feeling" in 1988.

2008-2011: Mick Medew and the Rumours
In 2008, he formed Mick Medew and the Rumours, after a sabbatical from the music industry, with Ash Geary on guitar and vocals, Paul Hawker on bass guitar and Chris Dixon on drums. The band released a debut album, For Your Love, on I-94 Bar Records in 2009, then toured the east coast of Australia in 2010. They went on hiatus in 2011. 

In 2011 the "classic" line-up of the Screaming Tribesmen re-formed to play dates on the east coast of Australia and release re-mastered version of their classic recordings Date with a Vampyre, Top of the Town and Bones and Flowers.

In 2013, Medew released The Mesmerisers with The Mesmerisers. 

On 30 March 2015 he was awarded the prestigious GW McLennan Lifetime Achievement Award at the 2015 Queensland Music Awards.

In 2019, Open Season, was released in June 2019 on I-94 Bar Records.

Discography

Awards

Queensland Music Awards
The Queensland Music Awards (previously known as Q Song Awards) are annual awards celebrating Queensland, Australia's brightest emerging artists and established legends. They commenced in 2006.

|-
| 2015
| himself
| Grant McLennan Lifetime Achievement Award 
|

References

General
  Note: Archived (on-line) copy has limited functionality.
  Note: (on-line) version established at White Room Electronic Publishing Pty Ltd in 2007 and was expanded from the 2002 edition, and appears to have an 'Internal Service Error' as from May 2010.

Specific

Australian songwriters
People from Brisbane
Australian rock singers
Living people
Australian rock guitarists
Year of birth missing (living people)